Fahner is a surname. Notable people with the surname include:
 Bernhard Fahner (born 1963), Swiss alpine skier and Olympian
  (born 1966), German athletics competitor
 Tyrone C. Fahner (born 1942), American lawyer and politician